Air Chief Marshal Sir Arthur Penrose Martyn Sanders,  (17 March 1898 – 8 February 1974) was a Royal Flying Corps pilot during the First World War and a senior Royal Air Force commander during the Second World War and the immediate post-war years.

RAF career
Born the son of a clergyman Henry Martyn Sanders and his wife Maud Mary (née Dixon), Sanders was educated at Haileybury before undergoing officer training at Sandhurst. Sanders was commissioned into the Northumberland Fusiliers in April 1916 but transferred to the Royal Flying Corps a few weeks later. He was a pilot on No 5 Squadron RFC and in May 1917 was wounded in a dogfight with German aircraft. As a result, he lost his arm but managed to land his aircraft. As result of his disability, Sanders was appointed to junior staff officer duties in the latter part of the war. On 1 April 1918, Sanders was transferred to the Royal Air Force along with his fellow Flying Corps officers.

Sanders remained in the RAF after the war and made steady progress through the ranks.  He served in a variety of staff and instructional roles, notably serving on the air staff of Aden Command in 1932 and 1933. He was promoted to group captain just prior to the outbreak of the Second World War.

During the Second World War, he first served on the staff of the RAF staff College where he was responsible for planning the first wartime course. In 1940 Sanders was appointed the Director of Ground Defence at the Air Ministry and his work was in part responsible for the establishment of the RAF Regiment in 1942. In late 1942 Sanders was appointed Assistant Chief of Staff (Air) at the Allied Force Headquarters and in January 1943 he took up post at Air Officer Administration at Bomber Command.

After the war Sanders served as the Commandant of the RAF staff College at Bracknell before spending much of 1948 as Air Officer Commanding in Chief of British Air Forces of Occupation. He then served as Vice Chief of the Air Staff and Deputy Chief of the Air Staff. In May 1952 Sanders became Commander in Chief of the RAF's Middle East Air Force before his final tour as Commandant of the Imperial Defence College. He retired on 29 January 1956.

References

|-

|-

|-

|-

1898 births
1974 deaths
British Army personnel of World War I
Graduates of the Royal Military College, Sandhurst
Royal Northumberland Fusiliers officers
Royal Flying Corps officers
Royal Air Force air marshals
People from Streatham
English aviators
Knights Grand Cross of the Order of the Bath
Knights Commander of the Order of the British Empire
Commanders of the Legion of Merit
Commanders with Star of the Order of Polonia Restituta
People educated at Haileybury and Imperial Service College
Royal Air Force personnel of World War II
Military personnel from London